Bagpuss is a British animated children's television series which was made by Peter Firmin and Oliver Postgate through their company Smallfilms. The series of thirteen episodes was first broadcast from 12 February to 7 May 1974. The title character was "a saggy, old cloth cat, baggy, and a bit loose at the seams". Although only thirteen episodes were produced and broadcast, the programme remains fondly remembered, and was frequently repeated in the UK until 1986. In early 1999, Bagpuss topped a BBC poll for the UK's favourite children's television programme.

Characters
Bagpuss himself is a stuffed cloth cat, referred to in the intro as "The Most Important, The Most Beautiful, The Most Magical Saggy, Old Cloth Cat in the Whole, Wide World".

The six mice carved on the side of the "mouse organ" (a small mechanical pipe organ that played rolls of music) wake up and scurry around, singing in high-pitched voices. The names of the six mice are: Charlie Mouse, Jenny Mouse, Janey Mouse, Lizzy Mouse, Eddie Mouse and Willy Mouse, although only three of the mice are ever referred to by their name; the remaining three are named only in the books which accompany the series.

A rag doll made of scraps, called Madeleine, sits in a wicker chair. Gabriel the toad, unlike most Smallfilms characters, could move by a special device beneath his can without the use of stop-motion animation.

The wooden woodpecker bookend became the drily academic Professor Yaffle (based on the philosopher Bertrand Russell, whom Postgate had once met).

Voices and music
Sandra Kerr and John Faulkner provided the voices of Madeleine and Gabriel respectively and put together and performed all the folk songs. All the other characters' voices, including that of the narrator, were performed by writer Postgate.

Format
The scene is set at the turn of the 20th century, with Emily Firmin (Peter Firmin's daughter) playing the part of the Victorian child Emily. The first antique village vignette is a cropped image of Horrabridge taken in 1898, though nothing is known of the other photo of the children with the pram. The shop window was at the Firmin family home in Blean.

Each programme begins in the same way: through a series of sepia photographs, the viewer is told of a little girl named Emily (played by Emily Firmin, the daughter of illustrator Peter Firmin), who owned a shop. Emily finds lost and broken things and displays them in the window, so their owners could come to collect them; the shop doesn't sell anything.

She would leave the object in front of her favourite stuffed toy, the large, saggy, pink and white striped cat named Bagpuss. Emily then recites a verse:

After Emily had left, Bagpuss woke up. The programme shifts from sepia to colour stop motion film and various toys in the shop come to life.

After being introduced by the narrator, the toys discuss what the new object is; one of them tells a story related to the object (sometimes shown in an animated thought bubble over Bagpuss's head), often with a song, accompanied by Gabriel on the banjo (which often sounded a lot more like a guitar) and then the mice, singing in high-pitched squeaky harmony to the tune of Sumer Is Icumen In as they work, mending the broken object. There is much banter between the characters, with the pompous Yaffle constantly finding fault with the playful mice: his complaint, 'Those mice are never serious!' becomes his main catchphrase. However, peace is always restored by the end of the episode, usually thanks to the timely intervention of Bagpuss, Gabriel or Madeleine. The newly mended object is then placed in the shop window, so that whosoever had lost it would see it as they went past and could come in to collect it. Then Bagpuss starts yawning again and as he falls asleep the narrator would speak as the colour faded to sepia and they all freeze in time again, or as the narrator states, 'they go to sleep too'.

Broadcasting
The series was originally broadcast in the United Kingdom, at 1:45 pm, on BBC1. The BBC sold the series to the Dutch broadcaster Nederlandse Christelijke Radio-Vereniging and the series was transmitted in the Netherlands from October 1976. The series was also transmitted in Italy from February 1977.

Episodes
The titles of the episodes each refer in some way to the object Emily found.

Production

The programmes were made using stop-frame animation. Bagpuss is an actual cloth cat, but was not intended to be such an electric pink. In Firmin's words: "It should have been a ginger marmalade cat but the company in Folkestone dyeing the material made a mistake and it turned out pink and cream. It was the best thing that ever happened".

Madeleine the rag doll was made by Firmin's wife, Joan, with an extra long dress to hold their children's nightdresses, but Postgate asked Joan to make a new version as one of the characters.

Gabriel the Toad was the only character in the series who could move freely without the use of stop-frame animation. Scenes featuring him playing the banjo and singing would have taken quite a bit of time if filmed with the stop-frame method, so Peter Firmin created a mechanism that helped him control Gabriel through a hole in his can. The character was based on a real toad that lived in the basement area of the flat that Peter and Joan rented in Twickenham beside the River Thames. Gabriel (named after Walter Gabriel in The Archers, a long-running British radio soap opera) was originally made for Firmin's live ITV programme The Musical Box. Postgate chose him to be one of the characters in Bagpuss and he was made into a new, slightly larger version.

Professor Yaffle was created as the book-end who had access to "facts". The BBC did not like the original character, a man in top hat made from black Irish bog oak, called "Professor Bogwood". They thought he was too frightening and asked for a non-human instead.

Most of the stories and songs used in the series are based on folk songs and fairy tales from around the world.

Legacy
In 1987, the University of Kent at Canterbury awarded honorary degrees to Postgate and Firmin. In his speech, Postgate stated that the degree was really intended for Bagpuss, who was subsequently displayed in academic dress.

In 1999, Bagpuss came first in a BBC poll selecting the nation's favourite children's programme made and broadcast by that corporation. It also came fourth in the Channel 4 poll, The 100 Greatest Kids' TV Shows, broadcast in 2001.

In 2002 and 2005, a stage show of Bagpuss songs toured the UK folk festivals and theatres with original singers Sandra Kerr and John Faulkner, along with Kerr's daughter Nancy Kerr and her husband, James Fagan.

In June 2002, the charity Hospices of Hope opened the Bagpuss Children's Wing in its hospice in Brașov, Romania. The wing was funded entirely by Postgate from royalties received from the BBC. In April 2012, Marc Jenner from Tunbridge Wells in Kent ran in the Virgin London Marathon dressed in a  Bagpuss costume to raise money for the charity, supported by Emily Firmin (seen in the programme's opening titles) and Postgate's family.

Thom Yorke of the band Radiohead has claimed to be a fan of the series, watching it with his son. It was an influence for 2003 album Hail to the Thief. Gabriel's song in Episode 2 was the acknowledged inspiration for the album track (and first single) "There There" (originally titled "The Bony King of Nowhere").

Bagpuss appeared in The Official BBC Children in Need Medley in 2009, along with many other British children's characters.

Bagpuss appeared on one of the twelve postage stamps issued by Royal Mail in January 2014 to celebrate classic children's programmes.

Bagpuss was displayed with Rupert Bear in the Rupert Bear Museum in Canterbury, part of the Canterbury Heritage Museum. After its closure at the end of 2017, he and Rupert Bear moved to the Beaney House of Art and Knowledge in Canterbury.

In 2014, Emily Firmin and Dan Postgate, surviving children of the series creators, created the account  to share archive footage not widely available, such as several short stories narrated by Oliver Postgate.

The first episode of the BBC show Man Like Mobeen was called Bagpuss.

In the fourth season of The Crown, Bagpuss made a cameo appearance on the episodes "Fairytale" and "Favourites", in which the fictionalized version of Princess Diana (played by Emma Corrin) watched the show in two aforomentioned episodes.

Home media

VHS

DVDs
The full series was released on DVD, in April 2005 and in 2007. It was later re-released in April 2015.

BBC iPlayer
The entire series was released onto the BBC iPlayer for the first time in May 2021 for 30 days.

Music
A CD of the original songs was released in 1999. The CD was re-released as well as a vinyl LP, again of the original songs from the series, in 2018.

Books
Several books have been released over the years to accompany the series.
 The Bagpuss Annual (1974)
 The Second Bagpuss Annual (1975)
 Mr Rumbletum's Gumboot (1975)
 The Song of the Pongo (1975)
 Silly Old Uncle Feedle (1975)
 Bagpuss in the Sun (1975)
 Bagpuss on a Rainy Day (1975)
 The New Bagpuss Annual 2001 (2000)
 Little Book Of Bagpuss (2005)
 The Big Book of Bagpuss (2007)
 Happy Birthday Bagpuss! (2014)

References

External links
 
 
 The Smallfilms Treasury's Bagpuss site
 Bagpuss at British Film Institute Screen Online
 Bagpuss & Co

1970s British animated television series
1970s British children's television series
1974 British television series debuts
1974 British television series endings
BBC children's television shows
British children's animated comedy television series
Animated television series about cats
Television series by Smallfilms
Television series set in shops
Sentient toys in fiction
British stop-motion animated television series
Television shows adapted into novels
English-language television shows